Sutton Grammar School (formerly Sutton Grammar School for Boys) is a selective state grammar school for boys aged 11–18 with a coeducational sixth form. Located in South London, the school's main site is in Sutton and its playing fields are in neighbouring Cheam.

History

Early life

The school has undergone several name changes; it used to be known as Sutton County Grammar School, Sutton Manor School (owing to its proximity with the old Sutton Manor) and more recently Sutton Grammar School for Boys.

The first headmaster of the school was E H Hensley, who read mathematics at Cambridge University and became a wrangler by achieving a first class degree. The first Second Master (or Deputy Headmaster) was L A Valencia, who read Classics at Cambridge University.

The school was founded on a site between Throwley Way and the High Street in Sutton, and officially opened in a ceremony on 21 July 1899. The main building was opened in 1928 on Manor Lane, directly opposite Manor Park in Sutton.

The Sutton School Song was composed in 1935 by the chairman of the governors, Courtenay Gale, and the words were written by a Mr Horn, a classics master, with the school motto, "Floreat Suttona" (Latin: "May Sutton flourish"), as the refrain. In 1954, however, "Keep Faith" was adopted as a new motto, with "Floreat Suttona" being used only occasionally, for example, as a sign off in communiqués to old boys of the school (known as "Old Suttonians").

Today

Since 1 June 2011, the school has had academy status, and its name formally changed from Sutton Grammar School for Boys to Sutton Grammar School, although it remains a selective grammar school for boys. From September 2017, however, it began accepting applications from girls to join the sixth form.

The current headmaster is B Cloves, who joined in 2019. His predecessor, G D Ironside, was headmaster of the school for 29 years. The deputy headmistress is a Ms Ross, who joined in 2018.

The school is divided into three sections – the Lower School (years 7–9), the Upper School (years 10 and 11) and the Sixth Form (Lower Sixth and Upper Sixth) – each of which attracts its own dress code. Uniform consists of a maroon blazer with a house tie in the Lower School, a black blazer with a house tie in the Upper School and a lounge suit and tie of the pupil's choice in the Sixth Form.

The school operates a prefect system with a head boy, three deputy head boys, senior prefects and part-time prefects from the Sixth Form.

In popular culture 
Scenes for the Hollywood film Black Sea, starring Jude Law and directed by Kevin Macdonald, were shot outside the school on 1 August 2013. Law appears in the scenes getting in and out of a car whilst pupils walk out of the school in the background.

Fictional music character Mr.B The Gentleman Rhymer, who performs "chap hop" (hip-hop delivered in a Received Pronunciation accent), is described as having attended the school by his creator, Jim Burke, a British parodist.

A prank played by pupils at the school attracted national press coverage, including from The Sun, and generated online debate in 2009. Pupils moved numerous bricks onto the roof of the main building to spell out the word "cock" in large letters, which was spotted on Google Earth.

Headmasters and headmistresses

Academics

The school is consistently ranked amongst the top schools in the country. It placed 13th out of all secondary schools in England in academic league tables in 2015, putting it in the top 0.05%. The school regularly features in The Sunday Times' list of the "Best secondary schools in London", placing seventh in 2020 and eleventh in 2023, and was named The Sunday Times' 10th best state secondary school in London in 2021.

In 2016, The Independent described the school as part of "a small group of elite feeder schools" in South East England that sends a disproportionate number of pupils to Oxbridge and contributes to a north-south bias in Oxbridge admissions. In 2016, for example, over 11% of all university places secured by pupils in the sixth form were at Oxbridge, with all Oxbridge applicants having successfully secured their place.

In 2017, The Sunday Times and The Independent featured the school in articles about the top schools in England that "eclipse Eton in ranking for A-level science", referring to a science, technology, engineering, and mathematics league table in which the school placed 12th in the country. In the same year, the school was nominated under the category "Science, technology and engineering teacher or team of the year" in the Times Educational Supplement Schools Awards 2017.

One of the school's pupils, Krtin Nithiyanandam, received international press coverage in 2015 after he developed a test for Alzheimer's disease and autism aged 15, for which he was awarded the Scientific American Innovator Award in 2015. He again received widespread press coverage in 2016 after he discovered a way to make deadly triple negative breast cancer more treatable. He conducted this research in the school's laboratories. The Guardian named him alongside Sasha Obama (daughter of Barack and Michelle Obama) and Brooklyn Beckham (son of David and Victoria Beckham) in its "teen power list" of 2016, and profiled him as a "rising star of 2017".

Admissions 
The school is selective, requiring pupils to pass an eleven plus examination in order to gain admission. In 2013, The Telegraph ranked it third in a list of the most oversubscribed schools in England, describing it as part of "an elite group of grammar schools...with more than a thousand applications". The school sells mock entrance examinations to parents of prospective pupils, which generated an income of £70,000 in 2016.

5 News broadcast a report on the school in 2016, interviewing headmaster G D Ironside and pupils and covering issues including elitism and life at the school.

The school admits pupils from ages 11–18, or years 7–13 in the English academic system, although the majority of students join the school in year 7 or year 12. There are 135 pupils in each year in the Lower School (years 7–9) and Upper School (years 10 and 11), and slightly fewer in the sixth form, varying year-on-year. In September 2015, the number of students admitted in year 7 was increased from 120 to 135.

School grounds
The school's main site is located in Sutton and its playing fields are located in neighbouring Cheam. There has recently been extensive building work carried out to expand the main site.

Main site
The main site consists of the following:
Main building: Oldest school building, until recently featuring original Victorian panelled windows. Includes the school hall, multiple science laboratories, English classrooms, an RE classroom and a drama studio. Contains a World War I memorial, listing the names of the 81 boys and one master who died during the war.
Library: Large building containing fiction, non-fiction and reference books. Overseen by a full-time adult librarian and some part-time student librarians. Contains computers for academic use.
Dining hall: Recently completed in 2016 to replace the old canteen. Extends into the sixth form building.
Sports hall: Opened in July 2005 at a cost of £1.1m by Sir Bobby Robson, who helped fund part of the hall and whose grandson attended the school. Contains numerous sports facilities and modern foreign language classrooms.
Swimming pool: Outdoor, semi-heated pool.
Humanities building: Contains computer science and history classrooms as well as one of the school's two drama studios.
Music and design technology building: Contains a music classroom, soundproof music practice rooms and two DT rooms (containing an IT suite, practical workshop with heavy machinery and design suite).
Mathematics building: Newly built for the academic year commencing in 2012, housing six new classrooms primarily used for mathematics.
Sixth form building: Newly built in 2015, housing geography, art, politics, business, RE and psychology classrooms. The sixth form centre is made up of the IT room, boardroom, study room and common room on the top floor.

Walch Memorial Playing Fields

The Walch Memorial Playing Fields are located off Northey Avenue, Cheam, and typically referred to by pupils and staff at the school as "Northey". They are extensive off-site grounds to which pupils are transported a short distance in the school coach or minibuses. They consist of the following:

Pavilion: Overlooking the playing fields, this building contains the school bar and an events room on the upper floor (predominantly used for Old Suttonians Association events, leavers' events and Sports Day), as well as sports changing rooms and a small shop on the ground floor. Nearby stands a World War II memorial, commemorating over 100 former pupils who died during the war.
Sports fields: Contains football and rugby pitches, cricket fields, an athletics track, long/triple jump sandpits and a cross-country course.

Extracurricular activities

Sports

The school offers the following sports:

Sports take place at the on-site sports hall, main school hall, swimming pool, Walch Memorial Playing Fields in Cheam and Sutton Junior Tennis Centre.

The most widely played sport at the school is football, followed by cricket. In years 7–10, sports team are generally split into 'A', 'B' and 'C' teams for each year group. Then, there are four further teams covering year 11 to upper sixth (referred to as the 1st XI, 2nd XI, etc.).

The highlight of the cricket calendar is the 1st XI match against Marylebone Cricket Club.

The school has a strong tradition of providing ballboys for the Wimbledon tennis championships.

In 2016, the rugby 1st XV finished runner-up in the Emerging Schools League. and the school won the Borough Cross-country competition.

Until recently, patball – a hand and ball game said to have been invented at Dulwich College and borrowing from other sports such as Eton Fives – was popular at the school. The decline in patball's popularity within the school can be attributed to year groups being assigned separate sections of the playground as part of COVID-19 restrictions.

Societies

There are various active societies within the school, including:

Choral, orchestral, musical theatre and drama productions are often held in conjunction with Sutton High School for Girls. Recent productions include The Comedy of Errors, Grease, Loserville, The Wedding Singer, Sweet Charity, Oklahoma!, West Side Story and The Murder in the Red Barn.

In 2017, the school won the Big Voice Mooting Competition, which was adjudicated by Brian Kerr, Baron Kerr of Tonaghmore and held at the UK Supreme Court. In the same year, the school finished runner-up in The Times/Kingsley Napley Student Advocacy Competition, which was adjudicated by Anne Rafferty and Max Hill and held at the headquarters of The Times.

In 2016, the school finished runner-up in the national finals of the Young Enterprise competition, held at the Emirates Stadium – a competition in which it has often enjoyed success.

Other
In 2020, a pupil won the Manufacturing Technologies Association's Technology, Design and Innovation Challenge, a leading extracurricular competition for design and technology pupils in the UK, which is judged by a panel of industry figures representing MTA members. The pupil won the Best Overall prize in the 17-19 age category, an individual prize and funding for design and technology equipment for the school.

In 2019, pupils from the school won the 14–16 and 17–19 age categories of the Manufacturing Technologies Association Technology, Design and Innovation (TDI) Challenge at the European headquarters of Yamazaki Mazak Corporation. The winner of the 17–19 age category had previously won the 14–16 category for the school in 2016.

In 2017, a pupil was named Young Engineer of the Year by the Worshipful Company of Scientific Instrument Makers, a livery company of the City of London, and went on to represent Great Britain at the Intel International Science and Engineering Fair in Los Angeles. Previously, another pupil had also been named Young Engineer of the Year in 2011.

In 2016, the school won the international final of the Space Design Competition in the USA, having previously won the UK final.

The school runs various domestic and international trips every year. Recent trips have included Washington, D.C., Normandy, the Rhineland, Spain, European battlefields, the Arctic Circle and numerous ski trips.

There are various publications produced by pupils of the school and distributed within and outside the school's community, including the geography magazine Latitude 51°, the history magazine Retrospect, the biology magazine Life and the school magazine The Suttonian.

Houses
Upon entry to the school, pupils are allocated to one of five forms, each form being associated with one of the five houses:

 Manor (Blue)  Warwick (Yellow)  Greyhound (Green)  Lenham (Red)  Throwley (Orange)

If a pupil has a brother already at the school, he is ordinarily placed in the same house as his brother upon entry. The names of the houses represent the four boundary roads of the existing school site and the road upon which the school was originally founded just a short distance away (Throwley Road). These names were suggested in 2017 by head of geography and Old Suttonian R Pletts to replace the houses of Blue, Brown, Green and Red, previously Scott, Drake, Nelson and Hood which had been in existence since 1920 and had themselves replaced the original houses of North, South, East and West.

House Shield

The House Shield is a competition based on house points, awarded for academic and sporting achievement. As part of the House Shield, the following events are held each year:

House captains
Each year, the house masters appoint house captains, secretaries and occasionally vice-captains, who lead pupils in pastoral activities throughout the year. Many address pupils during assemblies, help to organise sports teams, lead the warm-up lap in opening the annual house athletics championship and, at the end of their tenure, help to select their successor. They are assisted by a secretary and occasionally a vice-captain.

Combined Cadet Force

The school's Combined Cadet Force was raised in early 1915 and officially recognised by the War Office in June 1915.

Over the years, boys from the school’s CCF have both served and fought for their country in successive campaigns and wars. In the school's main building, the World War I memorial lists the names of the 80 boys and one master who died during the war. More recently, a World War II memorial was built at the Walch Memorial Playing Fields. It was constructed from 114 stones cemented together in a cairn, each representing a single former pupil who died during the war, and each collected and carried down from over 100 peaks in the United Kingdom. On 15 November 2015, a dedication ceremony was conducted by Old Suttonian Jack Noble and attended by staff, former staff, cadets, former cadets, parents and old boys. A guard of honour was held, executed by year 11 and upper sixth cadets under the command of Old Suttonian serving officers, and the names of the dead were read, as well as the Laurence Binyon poem, "For the Fallen".

The officer team of the CCF is headed by David Hobbs, an ex-head cadet and ex-head boy. The CCF is under the leadership of this officer team and an annually appointed cadet corporal major (srmy section) and cadet warrant officer (RAF section) from the ranks of the sixth form cadets. The head of the RAF section has long been SGiles Peter Benedict Marshall, a teacher at the school.

In the late 1990s, sponsored by the Blues and Royals of the Household Cavalry, the srmy section of the CCF began to admit girls from Nonsuch High School for Girls and, in 2007, the RAF section followed suit.

The CCF celebrated its centenary in 2016 at the Royal Air Force Club, a London gentlemen's club.

As of 2016, the CCF is the most popular extracurricular activity at the school, with around 300 cadets from year 9 to Upper Sixth from both the school and Nonsuch High School for Girls.

The Old Suttonians Cadet Association, which is affiliated to the Old Suttonians Association, enables ex-cadets to stay in contact with each other.

Old Suttonians Association

Old boys of the school are known as "Old Suttonians" (often abbreviated to "Old Sutts") and use the post-nominal letters "OS". The Old Suttonians Association is the membership group for old boys of the school.

The sssociation was founded as the Old Suttonians Football Club in 1906, and soon after as the Old Suttonians Association in 1909. Both were formed by a master of the school, S A Birks. 2006, therefore, saw the one-hundredth anniversary of the Old Suttonians Football Club, whilst the association itself celebrated its centenary in 2009. The Old Suttonians Cadet Association marked its tenth anniversary in the same year.

The Association runs an annual reunion dinner in September of each year and, on a more intermittent basis, reunions for the various year groups, most recently for those at the school under the headmastership of E H Hensley or J A Cockshutt. In 2015, a lunch was held at the Royal Air Force Club to mark G D Ironside's 25th anniversary as headmaster, at which many Old Suttonians were present.

Subscribing Old Suttonians receive a copy of the school's annual publication, The Suttonian.

There are seven clubs affiliated to the Association:

The Cowdray Club (named after Weetman Pearson, 1st Viscount Cowdray GCVO PC, who gifted the permanent home of the Royal Air Force Club, a London gentlemen's club)
The Old Suttonians Basketball Club
The Old Suttonians Cadet Association
The Old Suttonians Cricket Club
The Old Suttonians Football Club
The Old Suttonians Rugby Football Club
The Old Suttonians Scuba Club

In its lifetime, the Old Suttonians Association has had a very diverse range of affiliated activities attached to it. A literary and debating society, a cycling and rambling club, chess and bridge clubs, and a very strong swimming club were all in evidence at some point during the period 1909–1970.

Freemasonry 

The school has links to Freemasonry, specifically the Athene Lodge, which meets at Sutton Masonic Hall. The lodge typically publishes a report in the school's annual publication, The Suttonian, with updates on the activities of the lodge and information for pupils and Old Suttonians considering joining.

The lodge was established by a group of Old Suttonians who met in 1931 to consider forming a masonic lodge to meet in Sutton. On 25 January 1932, a petition bearing 23 signatures was forwarded to the Provincial Grand Master of Surrey, requesting approval from the Grand Master to grant a warrant of constitution to form a regular lodge to meet under the name “Athena” in reference to the close association to the school. (References are made to Athena, the Greek goddess of wisdom, in The Sutton School Song.) On 10 February 1932, news was received that the Provincial Grand Master, Charles, Prince of Wales, had approved the petition and it had been sent to the Grand Secretary of the United Grand Lodge of England. On 2 March 1932, a new warrant was issued under the slightly amended name of “Athene” and arrangements were put in place for the consecration ceremony to take place at Mark Masons' Hall, London, on 10 May 1932. Then-headmaster of the school, J A Cockshut, was invested as Senior Warden of the Lodge.

In the following years, through loans and donations, Athene Lodge became a Hall Stone Lodge and then a Patron Lodge of the Royal Masonic Hospital in 1939. After World War II, information was received that the contract for the purchase of the Sutton Masonic Hall had been signed and exchanged, and the lodge contributed 300 guineas to become a shareholder. At a meeting on 17 December 1949, it was reported that a petition had been signed for a warrant of constitution for a Royal Arch Chapter to be attached to the lodge. At the following meeting in February 1950, it was reported that the petition had been approved by the Supreme Grand Chapter and the new Athene Chapter was consecrated on 9 May 1950.

The lodge of instruction, which was sanctioned by the lodge at the first meeting after consecration, met at the school for the first 25 years.

Notable staff
Keith Blunt – football manager and coach (Sutton United, Tottenham Hotspur and Malmö FF), technical director of the FA's School of Excellence and member of the FA's Coaching Hall of Fame
Ted Powell – Team GB footballer and coach of England under-18 and Malawi national football teams

Notable former pupils

Politics
Brian Paddick, Baron Paddick – politician, life peer, Liberal Democrat candidate in the 2008 London mayoral election and former Deputy Assistant Commissioner, Metropolitan Police
Peter Penfold – British High Commissioner, Sierra Leone, and Governor of the British Virgin Islands
Sir Clive Whitmore – civil servant and principal private secretary to Margaret Thatcher

Science
Geoffrey Beale – leading protozoan geneticist
David Bellamy – botanist, broadcaster, author and environmental campaigner
David J. Farrar – engineer (developed the Bristol Bloodhound surface-to-air missile)
Douglas Frederick Hooper – psychologist
Krtin Nithiyanandam – British student, scientist, and inventor
Bob Scott – ornithologist

Media
Richard James Ayre – deputy chief executive, BBC News
James Hartigan – journalist and broadcaster
Roger Parry – media tycoon (chairman of YouGov and Johnston Press, chairman of the trustees of Shakespeare's Globe and CEO of Clear Channel International

Arts
Jeff Beck – rock guitarist named fifth in Rolling Stone's list of the "100 Greatest Guitarists of All Time"
Christopher Bigsby – novelist and BBC Radio broadcaster
James Farrar – writer, poet and No. 68 Squadron RAF pilot during WWII
Adam Riches – comedian
Jeremy Stangroom – author on philosophy

Sport
Peter Fear – Wimbledon and England under-21 footballer
David Fletcher – Surrey CCC cricketer
Matthew Holland – Great Britain water polo player
Mick Mellows – England amateur international, Reading and Portsmouth footballer
Mark Morris – Wimbledon footballer
Lucas Ness - footballer for Charlton Athletic F.C
Derek Piggott – renowned glider pilot and instructor
Tom Williams – Cyprus footballer

Miscellaneous
 Lionel Blackman – lawyer for the Chilean Government against Augusto Pinochet
 Anthony Nicholls – historian of modern Germany who was instrumental in rebuilding Anglo-German academic relations in the 1960s and '70s and fellow of St Antony's College, Oxford
 Lancelot Ware – biochemist, barrister and co-founder of Mensa International
 Donald Winch – economist and academic

Further reading

References

External links
Sutton Grammar School website
Sutton Grammar School PE website

Educational institutions established in 1889
Grammar schools in the London Borough of Sutton
Boys' schools in London
Academies in the London Borough of Sutton
1899 establishments in England